Jack Beaver (27 March 1900 – 10 September 1963) was a British film score composer and pianist. Beaver was born in Clapham, London. He studied at the Metropolitan Academy of Music, Forest Gate and then at the Royal Academy of Music under Frederick Corder. After graduating he worked for the BBC. In the early 1930s he played with the Michael Doré Trio and wrote some concert pieces, including the three movement Sonatina for piano. He also contributed music and arrangements for various BBC radio drama and music features, including most of the radio adaptions of films in collaboration with producer Douglas Moodie, throughout the 1930s and 1940s.

As (like Charles Williams) a member of the Gaumont–British Pictures composing team from the 1930s he was a prolific composer of film scores - around 40 scores between 1932 and 1947 - though many of his contributions were not credited. He wrote music for Alfred Hitchcock's The 39 Steps, and composed the pseudo piano concerto Portrait of Isla from the score for the 1940 Edgar Wallace film The Case of the Frightened Lady. This is perhaps the first example of a Romantic style "Denham Concerto" (or sometimes "tabloid piano concerto") composed especially for a film, a year before Richard Addinsell's much more famous Warsaw Concerto appeared in the film Dangerous Moonlight (1941).

Later in life Beaver was a regular contributor to the recorded music libraries, through which his march Cavalcade of Youth (1950) became widely known when it was used as signature tune for the BBC radio series The Barlowes of Beddington. Another example of his library music is Holiday Funfair (1954), performed by Dolf van der Linden And His Orchestra. He composed Sovereign Heritage for the National Brass Band Championships of 1954.

He died, aged 63, in Battersea, London. His son, Raymond Elgar Beaver, (19 August 1929 – 25 January 2008), was also a composer of film music.

Selected filmography

References

External links

 Sovereign Heritage, played by the Fairey Aviation Works Band in 1954

1900 births
1963 deaths
People from Clapham
British film score composers
British male film score composers
20th-century classical musicians
20th-century British composers
20th-century British male musicians
20th-century British musicians